Baume Abbey, in its village of Baume-les-Messieurs, Jura, France, was founded as a Benedictine abbey not far from the still-travelled Roman road linking Besançon and Lyon. It stands near the source of the Dard. Around it the village of Baume-les-Messieurs is congregated. The abbey is known for its sixteenth-century retable.

Early history

Jean Mabillon followed an early tradition that the abbey had been founded by Saint Columbanus, which would place the foundation in the late sixth century. Bernard Prost says that in 732 Saracen raiders destroyed the obscure community of monks, along with neighboring Château-Châlon and the village of Lons-le-Saunier. It was refounded during the reign of Louis the Pious in the early ninth century by Saint Eutice, probably a disciple of Benedict of Aniane, who was revitalizing and reordering the Benedictine communities of the Gauls. In 817, when Emperor Louis at Aachen divided the monasteries in his lands into three categories, monasterium Balma was one of only twelve that owed him annual subsidies.

However, more recent studies indicate that the first reference to Baume is around 869, and that it was not a Merovingian foundation. George Floyd Duckett suggests that the early traditions may confuse the Abbey of Baume-les-Messieurs with the older Baume-les-Nonnes or Baume-les-Dames.  

Passing through Besançon on his way to Rome in 869, Lothaire granted Baume and all its lands and goods to Arduic, archbishop of Besançon, but he died before the transfer could take effect. Beaume was among the royal properties that fell to the lot of Louis the German at the division effected in May 870. After the desolation of Burgundy by the Normans, 887—899, once again it had fallen into such desuetude, that its second refounding abbot, Berno, who was later called from Baume to found Cluny Abbey in 910, is generally credited with being its founder, about 890. Berno was confirmed as abbot in 895 by Pope Formosus, who took it and all its lands under the protection of the Holy See, asserting the right of the community to elect their own abbot, and threatening with excommunication any lay lord who might attach its lands and revenues; Berno took the prudent step of placing Baume under the secular patronage of Rudolph I of Burgundy. 

About 909, Odo with his noble companion Adegrin, found Baume and became a monk, priest, and then superior of the abbey school, bringing with him a library of 100 books.

Baume was punished for disobedience by Pope Eugenius III in 1147, for refusing a direct instruction from his Papal Legate. As a result, Beaume was reduced from being an independent Abbey to a priory of Cluny; the sentence was later confirmed by Adrian IV.
The notorious Jean de Watteville was abbé de Baume. Baume was secularised in 1753 and its canons were expelled in 1790, at the start of the French Revolution, when Baumes-les-Moines became Baume-les-Messieurs.

The abbey is a designated historic building. It is privately owned by a group that handles maintenance and schedules group tours.

In popular culture 

In the novel Raptor, the protagonist Thorn is born and lives his youth in the Abbey of St. Damian Martyr within a ringed cliff formation known in Gothic as the Balsan Hrinkhen (likely based on the formation in Baume-les-Messieurs, where Baume Abbey is located).

References

External links

Visiting information 
Baume-les-Messieurs

Churches in Jura (department)
Benedictine monasteries in France
Cluniac monasteries in France
Christian monasteries established in the 10th century